Princess Elisabeth of Hesse and by Rhine may refer to:
 Princess Elisabeth of Hesse and by Rhine (1864–1918) (Grand Duchess Elizabeth Feodorovna), daughter of Grand Duke Ludwig IV of Hesse and by Rhine and British Princess Alice, wife of Grand Duke Sergei Alexandrovich of Russia
 Princess Elisabeth of Hesse and by Rhine (1895–1903), daughter of Ernst Ludwig, Grand Duke of Hesse and by Rhine and his first wife, Princess Victoria Melita of Saxe-Coburg and Gotha, 
 Princess Elisabeth of Hesse and by Rhine (1821–1826), legal daughter of Louis II, Grand Duke of Hesse, possible daughter of Baron Augustus de Senarclens

See also
 Elisabeth of Hesse (disambiguation)